Wings of History is an aviation museum in San Martin, California. It is a nonprofit organization that operates using donations and membership dues.
 The museum also has a restoration shop, library, and propeller shop.

Hangars
The Wings of History museum has two large hangars filled with aircraft and instrument parts.

Hangar 1
Hangar 1 consists mainly of antique aircraft parts, like engines, and a full-size, complete albeit non-flying replica of the Wright Brothers' original Wright Flyer. This hangar also has many models and other highly detailed aircraft engines including

 95 horsepower British Cirrus engines, flown by such planes as the Westland IV, the Fairchild 22, and the Miles Hawk
 65 horsepower Continental, A-65, 4-cylinders, horizontally opposed
 220 horsepower Continental, R-670-4, 7 cylinders
 Kiekhaefer, Model V-105-2
 McCullock, Model 4310-A
 Nelson, Model H-44
 Salmson, Model 9-AD
 Pratt and Whitney, R-1830

Hangar 2
Hangar 2 consists mainly of complete aircraft, and a car-helicopter that was donated. Near the exit there is a flight simulator and collection of radar and flight instruments.

Outdoors

Outside the hangars, there is a 1938 American Eagle A-101, 1934 Aeronca C-3, 1934 Pietenpol Air Camper, 1940 Stinson Model 10]. Various experimental aircraft and the Vickers Viscount are also on display. Many of the restored or partially restored aircraft have working flight surfaces that are controllable through the cockpit.

References

External links
 Official website
 GREAT ESCAPE: Wings of History Air Museum
 

Aerospace museums in California
Museums in Santa Clara County, California
Non-profit organizations based in California